Bugs are an Australian three-piece rock band from Brisbane, Queensland, that formed in 2014.

In February 2022, the band announced the forthcoming release of their third studio album, Cooties.

Discography

Studio albums

Extended plays

Notes

References

Australian rock music groups
2014 establishments in Australia
Musical groups established in 2014
Musical groups from Brisbane